In Mandaeism, Shitil or Sheetil (Šītil) is an uthra (angel or guardian) from the World of Light. Shitil is considered to be the Mandaean equivalent of Seth.

Prayers in the Qolasta frequently contain the recurring formula "In the name of Hibil, Šitil, and Anuš".

Overview
According to the Mandaean scriptures, including the Qolastā, the Book of John and Genzā Rabbā, the angelic soteriological figure Sheetil (also spelled Shitil) is a son of Adam Qadmayya ("the first Adam") who taught John the Baptist with his brothers Anush (Enosh) and Hibil Ziwa (Abel). He is variously spoken of as a son of Adam, a brother or son of Hibil, and the brother or father of Anush. Sheetil is one of the revealers of Mandaeism, identified as the biblical Seth.

The Left Ginza mentions that Shitil was taken alive to the World of Light without a masiqta (death mass).

See also
 List of angels in theology

References

Uthras
Hebrew Bible people in Mandaeism
Entering heaven alive
Seth
Mandaean given names
Individual angels